Marich (also Romanized as Marīch; also known as Marīj) is a village in Geshmiran Rural District, Central District, Manujan County, Kerman Province, Iran. At the 2006 census, its population was 39, in 7 families.

References 

Populated places in Manujan County